Maria Michta-Coffey (born June 23, 1986) is an American race walker of Polish descent. She competed at the 2012 Summer Olympics in London in the 20 kilometer race walk after winning the U.S. Olympic trials with a time of 1:34:53.33. At the 2012 Olympics, she finished in 29th place in the 20 kilometer race walk with a time of 1:32:27, a new personal best.

Life and career
She had a strong 2014 season, setting four American records in the race walk, and even breaking her own American record in the 20 km twice in just over one month. She was the highest placed American finisher ever in the Women's 20 km IAAF World Race Walking Cup, setting a new American record of 1:30:49 and finishing 30th. Michta won her 6th National Title of 2014 on September 14 at the National 30k in Valley Cottage, NY.

Michta graduated from high school in the Sachem School District on Long Island in New York in 2004. She graduated as valedictorian from Long Island University C. W. Post Campus in 2008 and then became a PhD candidate at the Mount Sinai Medical School in biomedical science. Michta married her Sachem High School sweetheart Joe Coffey on July 3, 2014. She now races under the last name Michta-Coffey.
She defended her thesis entitled: "Hepatitis C virus cell entry determinants of occludin" in 2014 earning her Ph.D. in Biomedical Sciences.

While training for the 2016 Summer Olympics Michta-Coffey taught at Suffolk County Community College as an adjunct professor. She went on to win her 30th National Title on June 30 in Salem, Oregon at the US Olympic Trials in Track and Field earning her second Olympic Berth. She went on to finish 22nd at the Rio Summer Olympics, the highest finish by a female American race walker.

Michta-Coffey was inducted into the Suffolk Sports Hall of Fame on Long Island in the Track & Field Category with the Class of 2016.

Personal bests

Competition record

References

External links

 
 
 
  (2016)
  (2012)
 
 

1986 births
Living people
American people of Polish descent
American female racewalkers
Olympic track and field athletes of the United States
Athletes (track and field) at the 2012 Summer Olympics
Athletes (track and field) at the 2016 Summer Olympics
People from Stony Brook, New York
Sportspeople from Suffolk County, New York
World Athletics Championships athletes for the United States
Pan American Games track and field athletes for the United States
Athletes (track and field) at the 2011 Pan American Games
Athletes (track and field) at the 2015 Pan American Games
USA Outdoor Track and Field Championships winners
USA Indoor Track and Field Championships winners
21st-century American women
20th-century American women